Phyllomimus is an Asian genus of bush-crickets in the tribe Phyllomimini of the subfamily Pseudophyllinae; species have been recorded from India, China, Indochina and Malesia.

Species
The Orthoptera Species File lists:
subgenus Phyllomimulus Beier, 1954
Phyllomimus assimilis Walker, 1869
Phyllomimus temnophylloides Karny, 1924
Phyllomimus unicolor Brunner von Wattenwyl, 1895
subgenus Phyllomimus Stål, 1873
Phyllomimus acutipennis Brunner von Wattenwyl, 1895
Phyllomimus ampullaceus Haan, 1842
Phyllomimus apterus Brunner von Wattenwyl, 1895
Phyllomimus bakeri Karny, 1921
Phyllomimus borneensis Beier, 1954
Phyllomimus coalitus Xia & Liu, 1991
Phyllomimus curvicauda Bey-Bienko, 1955
Phyllomimus detersus (Walker, 1869)type species (as P. granulosus Stål, 1873; locality "Cochinchina")
Phyllomimus elliptifolius Pictet & Saussure, 1892
Phyllomimus inquinatus Brunner von Wattenwyl, 1895
Phyllomimus inversus Brunner von Wattenwyl, 1895
Phyllomimus klapperichi Beier, 1954
Phyllomimus musicus Carl, 1914
Phyllomimus mutilatus Brunner von Wattenwyl, 1895
Phyllomimus nodulosus Bolívar, 1900
Phyllomimus pallidus Brunner von Wattenwyl, 1895
Phyllomimus purpuratus Karny, 1924
Phyllomimus reticulosus Stål, 1877
Phyllomimus sinicus Beier, 1954
Phyllomimus sublituratus Walker, 1869
Phyllomimus tonkinae Hebard, 1922
Phyllomimus truncatus Brunner von Wattenwyl, 1893
Phyllomimus verruciferus Beier, 1954
Phyllomimus zebra Karny, 1920

References

External links
Photo of unidentidied Phyllomimus at Phuket nature tours.com

Pseudophyllinae
Tettigoniidae genera
Orthoptera of Indo-China
Orthoptera of Malesia